John Townsend may refer to:

John Townsend (author) (born 1952), American psychologist and author
John Townsend (basketball) (1916–2001), American basketball player
John Townsend (MP for Greenwich) (1819–1892), British politician and member of Parliament for Greenwich
John Townsend (educator) (1757–1826), English Congregationalist minister and founder of school for deaf children
John Townsend (footballer) (born 1943), Australian rules footballer
John Townsend (Irish politician) (1737–1810), Irish MP for Dingle, Doneraile and Castlemartyr
John Townsend (mayor) (1783–1854), 37th mayor of Albany, NY
John Townsend (MP for Warwick), English politician who sat in the House of Commons from 1597 to 1614
John Townsend (New York City) (1789–1863), New York politician
John Townsend (Oyster Bay) (1608–1668), early settler of the American colonies
John Townsend (Wisconsin politician) (born 1938), Wisconsin politician
Johnny Townsend (American football) (born 1995), American football player
John Townsend (1732–1809), cabinet maker of the Goddard and Townsend style
John G. Townsend Jr. (1871–1964), American businessman and politician, governor and senator from Delaware
John Kirk Townsend (1809–1851), American naturalist
John P. Townsend (1832–1898), American financier
John Rowe Townsend (1922–2014), British children's author
John Richard Townsend (1930–2013), British painter
John Sealy Townsend (1868–1957), Irish physicist
John Selby Townsend (1824–1892), American Democrat legislator and jurist from Iowa
John Townsend (musician), musician with the Sanford-Townsend Band

See also
John Townend (rugby league), rugby league footballer who played in the 1890s and 1900s
John Townend (born 1934), British politician
John Townshend (disambiguation)